Václav Nosek (26 September 1892 in Velká Dobrá – 22 July 1955 in Prague) was a Czechoslovak Communist politician who served as Minister of the Interior from 4 April 1945 to 14 September 1953.

Despite the fact that Nosek never hid his Communist views, he had spent World War II in exile in the United Kingdom, unlike most Czechoslovak Communists who were in the Soviet Union at the time. Czechoslovak non-Communist politicians considered Nosek one of the "good" Communists.

As Interior Minister, Nosek was a central figure in the 1948 Czechoslovak coup d'etat. When a majority of the cabinet voted to order Nosek to stop packing the police with Communists, Nosek ignored the order with the full backing of Prime Minister and Communist Party leader Klement Gottwald. On 21 February, 12 non-Communist ministers resigned in protest. President Edvard Beneš initially refused to accept their resignations, which would have normally forced Gottwald to either back down, resign or call new elections. By then, Gottwald had dropped all pretense of liberal democracy. He not only refused to resign, but demanded the appointment of a Communist-dominated government under threat of a general strike. Ultimately, Beneš gave in and appointed a Communist-dominated government, effectively giving legal sanction to a Communist coup.

After 1950, Nosek's influence decreased. The powers of the Ministry of the Interior were significantly curtailed when the security forces came under the Ministry of National Security, established by the Soviet model in May 1950. Until September 1953, Nosek served as Minister of the Interior and then until the end of his life as Minister of Labour and Social Welfare. He died of lung cancer in 1955 at the age of 62.

References

1892 births
1955 deaths
People from Kladno District
People from the Kingdom of Bohemia
Members of the Central Committee of the Communist Party of Czechoslovakia
Ministers of the Interior of Czechoslovakia
Members of the Interim National Assembly of Czechoslovakia